Pierre Charles Jean Joseph, Count Clerdent (29 April 1909 – 11 June 2006) was a Belgian politician.

Career 
During his career he was governor of Liege and Luxemburg.

Honours 
 Created Count Clerdent in 1995 by Royal order of King Albert II.
 Honorary Governor of Liege.
 Grand Cross in the Order of Leopold II.
 Grand Cross in the Order of Merit of the Federal Republic of Germany.
 Grand Officer in the Order of Leopold.
 Grand Officer in the Legion of Honour.
 Grand Officer in the Order of the Oak Crown.
 Grand Officer in the Order of Orange-Nassau
 Grand Officer in the Order of Merit of the Italian Republic
 Grand Officer in the Order of the Phoenix
 Knight Commander of the Royal Victorian Order.

See also 
 List of Belgian politicians

References

1909 births
2006 deaths
Counts of Belgium
Recipients of the Grand Cross of the Order of Leopold II
Knights Commander of the Order of Merit of the Federal Republic of Germany